The Neva King Cooper Educational Center is a historic school in Homestead, Florida. It is part of the Miami-Dade County Public Schools district. The school serves students with mental disabilities.

The school was built in 1914 as the Homestead Public School and designed by August Geiger. In 1934 it was renamed the Neva King Cooper School. On December 4, 1985, it was added to the U.S. National Register of Historic Places. The property is part of the Homestead Multiple Property Submission, a Multiple Property Submission to the National Register.

References
Notes

Bibliography

 Dade County listings at National Register of Historic Places
 Patricios, Nicholas N. Building Marvelous Miami. Gainesville, FL: University Press of Florida, 1994. .

External links

 
 Florida's Office of Cultural and Historical Programs
 Dade County listings
 Neva King Cooper School

Miami-Dade County Public Schools
National Register of Historic Places in Miami-Dade County, Florida
Public schools in Florida
Homestead, Florida
1914 establishments in Florida
School buildings completed in 1914